The 1933 Giro di Lombardia was the 29th edition of the Giro di Lombardia cycle race and was held on 15 October 1933, over a course of . The race started and finished in Milan.

106 cyclists departed from Milan and 61 of them completed the race.

Development
Canazza and Brambilla escaped in the first kilometres, but were caught and overcome by Piemontesi and Casini. They could not stay with the rhythm of Piemontesi and lost his wheel. Behind, a group of persecution was created, formed by Barral, Rimoldi and Sella who caught Piemontesi before the ascent to Brinzio. The test is decided in this climb, as Rimoldi and Sella are off the hook while Barral and Piemontesi gamble in the final sprint in the arena of Milan, where Piemontesi won.

General classification

References

External links
 Web oficial de la carrera ((in Italian))
 El Sitio de Ciclismo
 

1933
Giro di Lombardia
Giro di Lombardia